"Draped Up" is the first single from Bun B's solo debut album Trill. It samples elements from the song "Pimp Tha Pen" by DJ Screw. It features an intro from Lil' Keke. The official remix is on the album and it features Lil' Keke, Slim Thug, Chamillionaire, Paul Wall, Mike Jones, Aztek, Lil Flip, & Z-Ro.  The music video features cameo appearances by Chingy, Devin The Dude, Kanye West, Scarface, Spice 1, Paul Wall, Mike Jones, Lil' Keke, Lil' Flip, Slim Thug, Z-Ro, Trae Tha Truth, Aztek, & Birdman. The song topped out at #45 on the U.S. Hot R&B Chart.

Track listings

CD
 "Draped Up (Radio Remix)" 
 "Draped Up (Album Remix)" 
 "Draped Up (Instrumental)"

Charts

References

2005 debut singles
Bun B songs
Lil' Keke songs
Slim Thug songs
Chamillionaire songs
Paul Wall songs
Mike Jones (rapper) songs
Lil' Flip songs
Z-Ro songs
Songs written by Paul Wall
Songs written by Chamillionaire
Songs written by Mike Jones (rapper)
Songs written by Bun B
2005 songs
Songs written by Lil' Flip